Friedrich Gottlieb Barth (3 August 1738 – 6 October 1794) was a German philologist and writer.

He was born in Wittenberg, the son of Johann Christian Barth and his wife Catarina Elisabeth (née Krause).

1738 births
1794 deaths
People from Wittenberg
People from the Electorate of Saxony
German philologists
Writers from Saxony-Anhalt
German male writers